The Regent Diamond is a  diamond owned by the French state and on display in the Louvre, worth  £48,000,000.

History

Discovery 

According to legend, the diamond was discovered by an enslaved man in the Kollur Mine near the Krishna River and was concealed by the slave in a leg wound, which he suffered while fleeing the siege of Golconda. The slave then made to the Indian coast, where he met an English sea captain and offered him 50% of all profits made on the sale of the diamond in exchange for safe passage out of India. However, the sea captain killed the slave and sold the diamond to the eminent Indian diamond merchant Jamchand.

Pitt acquisition 
In a letter to his London agent dated 6November 1701, Thomas Pitt, the Governor of Fort St. George, writes:"... This accompanies the model of a Stone I have lately seene; it weighs Mang. 303 and carrtts 426. It is of an excellent christaline water without any fowles, only att{sic} one end in the flat part there is one or two little flaws which will come out in cutting, they lying on the surface of the Stone, the price they ask for it is prodigious being two hundred thousand pag. tho I believe less than one (hundred thousand) would buy it"

Pitt claimed he acquired the diamond from Jamchand for 48,000 pagodas in the same year, so it is sometimes also known as the Pitt Diamond. He dispatched the stone to London hidden in the heel of his son Robert's shoe aboard the East Indiaman Loyal Cooke, which left Madras on 9October 1702. It was later cut in London by the diamond cutter Harris, between 1704 and 1706. The cutting took two years and cost about £5,000

Rumours circulated that Pitt had fraudulently acquired the diamond, leading satirist Alexander Pope to pen the following lines in his Moral Essays"Asleep and naked as an INDIAN lay
An honest factor stole a gem away;
He pledged it to the Knight, the Knight had wit,
So kept the diamond, and the rogue was bit."

Pitt bought the diamond for £20,400, and had it cut into a  cushion brilliant.

Sale to the French Regent 
After many attempts to sell it to various Members of European royalty, including Louis XIV of France, it was purchased for the French Crown by the French Regent, Philippe II, Duke of Orléans, in 1717 for £135,000, at the urging of his close friend and famed memoirist Louis de Rouvroy, duc de Saint-Simon.  The stone was set into the crown of Louis XV for his coronation in 1722 and then into a new crown for the coronation of Louis XVI in 1775. It was also used to adorn a hat belonging to Marie Antoinette. In 1791, its appraised value was £480,000.

In 1792, during the revolutionary furore in Paris, "Le Régent", or the regent diamond, was stolen along with other crown jewels of France, but was later recovered. It was found in some roof timbers in an attic in Paris. The diamond was used as security on several occasions by the Directoire and later the Consulat to finance the military expenses: 1797-1798 it was pledged to the Berlin Entrepreneur Sigmund Otto Joseph von Treskow and 1798-1801 to the Dutch Banker Vandenberg in Amsterdam. In 1801 the gem was permanently redeemed by Napoleon Bonaparte.

Napoleon used it for the guard of his sword, designed by the goldsmiths Odiot, Boutet and Marie-Etienne Nitot. In 1812 it appeared on the Emperor's two-edged sword, which was a work of Nitot. Napoleon's second wife, Archduchess Marie Louise of Austria, carried the Régent back to Austria upon his exile. Later her father returned it to the French Crown Jewels. The diamond was mounted successively on the crowns of Louis XVIII, Charles X and Napoleon III.

Today, mounted in a Greek diadem designed for Empress Eugenie, it remains in the French Royal Treasury at the Louvre. It has been on display there since 1887. Experts have estimated the Regent Diamond value to be near £48,000,000.

Folklore 
Due to numerous scandals, and the misfortune of those who have been in possession of the stone, the Regent Diamond is said to be cursed.

See also
 List of diamonds

Notes 

Bibliography

 Brown, Peter Douglas. William Pitt, Earl of Chatham: The Great Commoner. Allen & Unwin, 1975

External links 
Regent diamond history in "Great Diamonds of the Earth" by Edwin Streeter

Objets d'art of the Louvre
Individual diamonds
Kollur diamonds
French Crown Jewels
Golconda diamonds